At the 2009 Jeux de la Francophonie, the judo events were held at the Michel el Murr Stadium in Beirut, Lebanon from 28 to 30 September. A total of 14 events were contested according to gender and weight division.

Medal winners

Men

Women

References

Sport in Lebanon
2009 Jeux de la Francophonie
Judo at the Jeux de la Francophonie
Francophonie Games
Judo competitions in Lebanon